Neervely is a village located in Jaffna, Sri Lanka. It is located 8 km from Jaffna along the Point Pedro road.

History
An ancient limestone Buddha (believed to be from pre-Christian to 6th century CE) was
found here and is now in the Jaffna Museum. An ancient well, stone pillars etc. have been found
at this so far un-excavated site. The ancient Buddhist place-name is cited as
"Neelavaella" (Archaeo. Dept. file EC/B/N/56 folio 73 ) and in several historical websites
.

Education in Neervely
 Attiar Hindu College, Neervely was established in 1929.
 Hindu Tamil mixed school, Neervely South.
 Ramupillai vithyalayam, Neervely West.
 Four other schools

Places of Worship
 Neervely Kanthaswami Temple
 Neervely Arasakesari Pillaiyar Temple
 Neervely Vaikaal Tharavai Pillaiyar Temple

Agriculture
Especially Banana, paddy and other vegetables etc.

Neervely has Sri Lanka's leading big banana market too.

Industries
Building construction, wood and metal works

Bank robbery
On March 25, 1981, militants of the Liberation Tigers of Tamil Eelam and Tamil Eelam Liberation Organization robbed a bank van of Rs. 8. 1 million rupees near Neervely. This was the last joint operation between LTTE and TELO.

References

External links
 http://www.neervely.ca

Villages in Jaffna District
Valikamam East DS Division